Ectopleura is a genus of hydrozoans in the family Tubulariidae.

Species
The genus contains the following species:
Ectopleura americana Peterson, 1990
Ectopleura antarctica (Billard, 1914)
Ectopleura apicisacciformis  Xu, Huang & Guo, 2007
Ectopleura atentaculata  Xu & Huang, 2006
Ectopleura attenoides  (Coughtrey, 1876)
Ectopleura bethae  (Warren, 1908)
Ectopleura crassocanalis Huang, Xu & Guo, 2011
Ectopleura crocea (Agassiz, 1862)
Ectopleura dumortierii (Van Beneden, 1844)
Ectopleura elongata Lin, Xu, Huang & Wang, 2010
Ectopleura exxonia  (Watson, 1978)
Ectopleura gemmifera  Xu, Huang & Guo, 2007
Ectopleura grandis  Fraser, 1944
Ectopleura guangdongensis  Xu, Huang & Chen, 1991
Ectopleura indica  Petersen, 1990
Ectopleura integra  (Fraser, 1938)
Ectopleura japonica  (Hirohito, 1988)
Ectopleura larynx  (Ellis & Solander, 1786)
Ectopleura latitaeniata  Xu & Zhang, 1978
Ectopleura marina  (Torrey, 1902)
Ectopleura mayeri  Petersen, 1990
Ectopleura media  Fraser, 1948
Ectopleura minerva  Mayer, 1900
Ectopleura multicirrata  Schuchert, 1996
Ectopleura obypa  Migotto & Marques, 1999
Ectopleura prolifica  Hargitt, 1908
Ectopleura radiata  (Uchida, 1937)
Ectopleura sacculifera  Kramp, 1957
Ectopleura triangularis  Lin, Xu, Huang & Wang, 2010
Ectopleura venusta  (Yamada, 1950)
Ectopleura viridis  (Pictet, 1893)
Ectopleura wrighti  Petersen, 1979
Ectopleura xiamenensis  Zhang & Lin, 1984
Ectopleura xuxuanii Xu, Huang & Guo, 2007

References

Tubulariidae
Hydrozoan genera